Robert Markham (14 June 1768 – 17 June 1837) was an English churchman, Archdeacon of York from 1794 until his death.

The son of Archbishop William Markham, he was educated at Christ Church, Oxford. He held livings at Barton in Fabis, Bishopthorpe and Bolton Percy.

Notes

Archdeacons of York
Alumni of Christ Church, Oxford
1768 births
1837 deaths
18th-century English Anglican priests
19th-century English Anglican priests